Jailson Severiano Alves (born 11 October 1984 in Duque de Caxias), known as Jailson is a Brazilian footballer who currently plays as a midfielder for 1. SC Sollenau. He is also working as an assistant manager for the club's U15 team.

References

External links

1984 births
Living people
Brazilian footballers
SC Austria Lustenau players
Association football midfielders
People from Duque de Caxias, Rio de Janeiro
Sportspeople from Rio de Janeiro (state)